John Waugh was Dean of Worcester from 1751 until his death on 19 April 1765.

The son of John Waugh, Bishop of Carlisle  he was educated at Queens' College, Cambridge. He was Vicar of Stanwix, Cumberland from 1727 to 65; Prebendary and Chancellor of Carlisle Cathedral from 1727 until 1751; and  Vicar of Bromsgrove tith the Mastership of St Oswald's Hospital, Worcester from 1754.

References

Alumni of Queens' College, Cambridge
1765 deaths
Deans of Worcester
Year of birth unknown